Siddhartha Gigoo, is an Indian author and film-maker He studied English literature at Jawaharlal Nehru University, New Delhi, India. He is the author of two  books of fiction,  The Garden of Solitude (2011), and A Fistful of Earth and Other Stories  (2015), which was longlisted for the Frank O'Connor International Short Story Award 2015. His short story "The Umbrella Man" won the Commonwealth Short Story Prize 2015 for Asia. Two books of his poems, Fall and Other Poems and Reflections were published by Writer’s Workshop, Kolkata. His writings have appeared in several literary magazines.

Gigoo has also written and directed two short films. "The Last Day",  set against the backdrop of the exodus and exile of Kashmiri Pandits from their homeland in 1990, Kashmir, India, was selected for the 6th International Documentary and Short Film Festival of Kerala, the 7th Annual FilmAid Film Festival (Kenya), the International Film Festival of Cinematic Arts–Short and Micro Cinema (Los Angeles), the 11th International Exile Film Festival (Sweden), the Kala Ghoda Arts Festival (Mumbai) and the Lucerne International Film Festival (Switzerland). "Goodbye, Mayfly" was selected for the Competition section of the 8th International Documentary and Short film festival of Kerala (2015).

References

External links
website

Screenwriters from Jammu and Kashmir
Novelists from Jammu and Kashmir
People from Srinagar